The following outline is provided as an overview of and topical guide to the United States of America:

General reference

Pronunciation: 
Abbreviations: USA or US
Common English country name: United States
Official English country name: United States of America
Common endonyms: United States, U.S., U.S.A., America
Official endonym: United States of America
Common exonyms: United States; America or The States (chiefly British/Commonwealth); North America (chiefly Latin America)
Adjectivals: United States, American 
Demonyms: American (among others)
Etymology
International rankings of the United States
ISO country codes: US, USA, 840
ISO region codes: See ISO 3166-2:US
Internet country code top-level domain: .us

Geography of the United States 

The United States is: a megadiverse country

Location (50 states):
Northern Hemisphere and Western Hemisphere (except western Aleutian Islands)
Americas
North America
Northern America
Oceania
Polynesia
Time zones:
Atlantic Standard Time (UTC-04), Atlantic Daylight Time (UTC-03) (Puerto Rico and the United States Virgin Islands)
Eastern Standard Time (UTC-05), Eastern Daylight Time (UTC-04)
Central Standard Time (UTC-06), Central Daylight Time (UTC-05)
Mountain Standard Time (UTC-07), Mountain Daylight Time (UTC-06)
Pacific Standard Time (UTC-08), Pacific Daylight Time (UTC-07)
Alaska Standard Time (UTC-09), Alaska Daylight Time (UTC-08)
Hawaii-Aleutian Standard Time (UTC-10), Hawaii-Aleutian Daylight Time (UTC-09)
Extreme points of the United States:
North: Point Barrow, Alaska 
South: Ka Lae, Island of Hawai'i, Hawai'i
East: Sail Rock, just offshore West Quoddy Head, Maine 
Physically East:  Eastern Semisopochnoi Island, Alaska 
West: Peaked Island, offshore Cape Wrangell, Attu Island, Alaska 
Physically West: Western Amatignak Island, Alaska 
High: Denali (Mount McKinley), Alaska at  
Low: Badwater Basin, Death Valley, California at  
Land boundaries: 12,034 km (7,477 mi)
 8,893 km (5,525 mi)
 3,145 km (1,954 mi)
Coastline: 19,924 km (12,380 mi)
Population of the United States: 	308,745,538 (2010 census) – 3rd most populous country
Area of the United States:  – 4th most extensive country
Atlas of the United States
Cities of the United States, by population

Environment of the United States

Beaches in the United States
Climate of the United States
Climate change in the United States
Environmental issues in the United States
Ecoregions in the United States
Renewable energy in the United States
Geothermal energy in the United States
Solar power in the United States
Wind power in the United States
Geology of the United States
Earthquakes in the United States
National parks of the United States
Protected areas of the United States
Superfund sites in the United States
Wildlife of the United States
Flora of the United States
Fauna of the United States
Birds of the United States
Mammals of the United States
Reptiles of the United States
Amphibians of the United States

Geographic features of the United States

Fjords of the United States
Glaciers of the United States
Islands of the United States
Lakes of the United States
Mountain peaks of the United States
The 104 highest major summits of the United States
The 129 most prominent summits of the United States
The 112 most isolated major summits of the United States
Alaska Range
Appalachian Mountains
Black Hills
Cascade Range
Ozark Mountains
Sierra Nevada
Rocky Mountains
Volcanoes of the United States
Rivers of the United States
Arkansas River
Columbia River
Colorado River
Connecticut River
Hudson River
Mississippi River
Missouri River
Potomac River
Rio Grande
Ohio River
Delaware River
Snake River
Susquehanna River
Yukon River
Waterfalls of the United States
Valleys of the United States
World Heritage Sites in the United States

Regions of the United States

East Coast of the United States
West Coast of the United States
Belt regions of the United States
New England
Mid-Atlantic
The South
Midwest
Great Plains
Pacific Northwest
Southwest
Hawaiian Archipelago

Physiographic divisions of the United States
The geography of the United States varies across their immense area. Within the continental U.S., eight distinct physiographic divisions exist, though each is composed of several smaller physiographic subdivisions. These major divisions are:

Laurentian Upland – part of the Canadian Shield that extends into the northern United States Great Lakes area.
Atlantic Plain – the coastal regions of the eastern and southern parts includes the continental shelf, the Atlantic Coast and the Gulf Coast.
Appalachian Highlands – lying on the eastern side of the United States, it includes the Appalachian Mountains, Adirondacks and New England province.
Interior Plains – part of the interior contentintal United States, it includes much of what is called the Great Plains.
Interior Highlands – also part of the interior contentintal United States, this division includes the Ozark Plateau.
Rocky Mountain System – one branch of the Cordilleran system lying far inland in the western states.
Intermontane Plateaus – also divided into the Columbia Plateau, the Colorado Plateau and the Basin and Range Province, it is a system of plateaus, basins, ranges and gorges between the Rocky and Pacific Mountain Systems. It is the setting for the Grand Canyon, the Great Basin and Death Valley.
Pacific Mountain System – the coastal mountain ranges and features in the west coast of the United States.

Administrative divisions of the United States

States of the United States

At the Declaration of Independence, the United States consisted of 13 states, former colonies of the United Kingdom. In the following years, the number of states has grown steadily due to expansion to the west, conquest and purchase of lands by the American government, and division of existing states to the current number of 50 United States:

Territories of the United States

United States territory
Territorial evolution of the United States

Incorporated organized territories
none since 1959

Incorporated unorganized territories

Palmyra Atoll

Unincorporated organized territories

Commonwealth of Puerto Rico
Commonwealth of the Northern Mariana Islands
Territory of Guam
Territory of the United States Virgin Islands

Unincorporated unorganized territories
Territory of American Samoa, technically unorganized, but self-governing under a constitution last revised in 1967

Baker Island, uninhabited
Howland Island, uninhabited
Jarvis Island, uninhabited
Johnston Atoll, uninhabited
Kingman Reef, uninhabited
Bajo Nuevo Bank, uninhabited (disputed with Colombia)
Serranilla Bank, uninhabited (disputed with Colombia)
Midway Islands, no indigenous inhabitants, currently included in the Midway Atoll National Wildlife Refuge
Navassa Island, uninhabited (claimed by Haiti)
Wake Atoll consisting of Peale, Wake and Wilkes Islands, no indigenous inhabitants, only contractor personnel (claimed by the Marshall Islands)

Geography of the states and territories
AK – AL – AR – AZ – CA – CO – CT – DC – DE – FL – GA – HI – IA – ID – IL – IN – KS – KY – LA – MA – MD – ME – MI – MN – MO – MS  MT – NC – ND – NE – NH – NM – NV – NJ – NY – OH – OK – OR – PA – RI – SC – SD – TN – TX – UT – VA – VT – WA – WI – WV – WY

AS – GU – MP – PR – VI

Demography of the United States

AK – AL – AR – AZ – CA – CO – CT – DC – DE – FL – GA – HI – IA – ID – IL – IN – KS – KY – LA – MA – MD – ME – MI – MN – MO – MS  MT – NC – ND – NE – NH – NM – NV – NJ – NY – OH – OK – OR – PA – RI – SC – SD – TN – TX – UT – VA – VT – WA – WI – WV – WY

AS – GU – MP – PR – VI

Climate of the United States

History of the United States

Period-coverage

Prehistory of the United States
Pre-Columbian era
Colonial period
1776 to 1789
1789 to 1849
1849 to 1865
1865 to 1918
1918 to 1945
1945 to 1964
1964 to 1980
1980 to 1991
1991 to 2008
2008 to present

History of the states and territories

AK – AL – AR – AZ – CA – CO – CT – DC – DE – FL – GA – HI – IA – ID – IL – IN – KS – KY – LA – MA – MD – ME – MI – MN – MO – MS  MT – NC – ND – NE – NH – NM – NV – NJ – NY – OH – OK – OR – PA – RI – SC – SD – TN – TX – UT – VA – VT – WA – WI – WV – WY

AS – GU – MP – PR – VI

Presidents of the United States

George Washington: 1789–1797
John Adams: 1797–1801
Thomas Jefferson: 1801–1809
James Madison: 1809–1817
James Monroe: 1817–1825
John Quincy Adams: 1825–1829
Andrew Jackson: 1829–1837
Martin Van Buren: 1837–1841
William Henry Harrison: 1841
John Tyler: 1841–1845
James K. Polk: 1845–1849
Zachary Taylor: 1849–1850
Millard Fillmore: 1850–1853
Franklin Pierce: 1853–1857
James Buchanan: 1857–1861
Abraham Lincoln: 1861–1865
Andrew Johnson: 1865–1869
Ulysses S. Grant: 1869–1877
Rutherford B. Hayes: 1877–1881
James A. Garfield: 1881
Chester A. Arthur: 1881–1885
Grover Cleveland: 1885–1889
Benjamin Harrison: 1889–1893
Grover Cleveland: 1893–1897
William McKinley: 1897–1901
Theodore Roosevelt: 1901–1909
William H. Taft: 1909–1913
Woodrow Wilson: 1913–1921
Warren G. Harding: 1921–1923
Calvin Coolidge: 1923–1929
Herbert Hoover: 1929–1933
Franklin D. Roosevelt: 1933–1945
Harry S. Truman: 1945–1953
Dwight D. Eisenhower: 1953–1961
John F. Kennedy: 1961–1963
Lyndon B. Johnson: 1963–1969
Richard M. Nixon: 1969–1974
Gerald Ford: 1974–1977
Jimmy Carter: 1977–1981
Ronald Reagan: 1981–1989
George H. W. Bush: 1989–1993
Bill Clinton: 1993–2001
George W. Bush: 2001–2009
Barack Obama: 2009–2017
Donald Trump: 2017–2021
Joe Biden: 2021–present

Government and politics in the United States

Form of government: presidential, federal republic
Capital (political) of the United States: Washington, D.C.
List of Capitals
Flag of the United States
Political parties in the United States
Elections in the United States
Voting rights in the United States
List of political parties in the United States
Democratic Party
History of the United States Democratic Party
Republican Party
History of the United States Republican Party
Green Party
Independent Party
Libertarian Party
Reform Party
Constitution Party
Socialist Party USA
Political divisions of the United States
Canadian and American politics compared
Politics of the Southern United States

Federal government

United States Constitution

Legislative branch

United States Congress
United States Senate
President pro tempore of the United States Senate, Patty Murray (D-WA)
United States House of Representatives
Speaker of the United States House of Representatives, Kevin McCarthy (R-CA)

Executive branch

Head of state and head of government, 46th President of the United States, Joseph R. Biden, Jr 
49th Vice President of the United States, Kamala D. Harris

Federal executive departments

All departments are listed by their present-day name and only departments with past or present cabinet-level status are listed. Order of succession applies only to within the cabinet; the vice president has always been first in the line of succession, and the Speaker of the House and the President pro tem of the Senate have at times been included.

Commissions

Federal Trade Commission
U.S. Securities and Exchange Commission

Judicial branch

United States federal courts
United States Supreme Court
Chief Justice of the United States, John Roberts
United States court of appeals
United States district court

State and territory governments

AK – AL – AR – AZ – CA – CO – CT – DC – DE – FL – GA – HI – IA – ID – IL – IN – KS – KY – LA – MA – MD – ME – MI – MN – MO – MS  MT – NC – ND – NE – NH – NM – NV – NJ – NY – OH – OK – OR – PA – RI – SC – SD – TN – TX – UT – VA – VT – WA – WI – WV – WY

AS – GU – MP – PR – VI

Politics of the states and territories

AK – AL – AR – AZ – CA – CO – CT – DC – DE – FL – GA – HI – IA – ID – IL – IN – KS – KY – LA – MA – MD – ME – MI – MN – MO – MS  MT – NC – ND – NE – NH – NM – NV – NJ – NY – OH – OK – OR – PA – RI – SC – SD – TN – TX – UT – VA – VT – WA – WI – WV – WY

AS – GU – MP – PR – VI

Foreign relations

Foreign policy of the United States

International organization membership

Member state of the Group of Twenty Finance Ministers and Central Bank Governors
Member state of the North Atlantic Treaty Organization
Member state of the Organization of American States
Member state of the United Nations
Member of the World Health Organization
Member of the World Organization of the Scout Movement
World Veterans Federation

Military

United States Army
United States Army Reserve
Army National Guard
United States Marine Corps
United States Marine Corps Reserve
United States Navy
United States Navy Reserve
United States Air Force
Air Force Reserve Command
Air National Guard
United States Space Force
United States Coast Guard
United States Coast Guard Reserve

Intelligence organizations

Central Intelligence Agency
Sixteenth Air Force
United States Army Military Intelligence
Defense Intelligence Agency
Marine Corps Intelligence Activity
National Geospatial-Intelligence Agency
National Reconnaissance Office
National Security Agency
Office of Naval Intelligence
Coast Guard Intelligence
Federal Bureau of Investigation
Drug Enforcement Administration
Bureau of Intelligence and Research
Office of Intelligence and Analysis
Office of Terrorism and Financial Intelligence
Office of Intelligence and Counterintelligence

Law of the United States

Adoption in the United States
Age of candidacy laws in the United States
Arbitration in the United States
Arbitration case law in the United States
Assisted suicide in the United States
Attorneys in the United States
Bankruptcy in the United States
Bicycle law in the United States
Birthright citizenship in the United States
Blasphemy law in the United States
Blue laws in the United States
Campaign finance reform in the United States
Cannabis in the United States
Capital punishment in the United States
Capital punishment debate in the United States
Censure in the United States
Census in the United States
Censorship in the United States
Book censorship in the United States
Censorship of broadcasting in the United States
Child-related laws
Child custody laws in the United States
Child labor laws in the United States
Child pornography laws in the United States
Child sexual abuse laws in the United States
Child support in the United States
Constitution of the United States
United States Bill of Rights
Separation of church and state in the United States
Separation of powers under the United States Constitution
Copyright law in the United States
Public domain in the United States
Crime in the United States
Polygamy in the United States
Race and crime in the United States
Rape in the United States
Scientific plagiarism in the United States
Human rights in the United States
Abortion in the United States
Censorship in the United States
Civil liberties in the United States
Freedom of association in the United States
Freedom of information in the United States
Freedom of movement under United States law
Freedom of religion in the United States
Freedom of speech in the United States
Freedom of the press in the United States
Gambling in the United States
LGBT rights in the United States
Marriage and union in the United States
Civil union in the United States
Same-sex unions in the United States
Domestic partnership in the United States
Marriage in the United States
Common-law marriage in the United States
Divorce in the United States
Same-sex marriage in the United States
Same-sex marriage law in the United States by state
Same-sex marriage legislation in the United States
Same-sex marriage status in the United States by state
Prisoner rights in the United States
Pro se legal representation in the United States
Prostitution in the United States
Right of foreigners to vote in the United States
Right to keep and bear arms
Gun law in the United States
Gun laws in the United States
Gun laws in the United States by state
Right to petition in the United States
Rights and responsibilities of marriages in the United States
Smoking in the United States
Smoking bans in the United States
Law enforcement in the United States
Local ordinance
Rent control in the United States
School anti-bullying legislation in the United States
Secession in the United States
Securities regulation in the United States
Speed limits in the United States
Rail speed limits in the United States
State law
Taxation in the United States
Capital gains tax in the United States
Cigarette taxes in the United States
Internal Revenue Code
Property tax in the United States
Zoning in the United States

Culture of the United States

American humor
American family structure
Architecture of the United States
Languages of the United States
American English
National symbols of the United States
Religion in the United States
Society of the United States
World Heritage Sites in the United States

American cuisine

Supermarket Chains in the United States
Food Companies in the United States
Fast Food Chains in the United States
Vineyards in the United States
Orchards in the United States

Historical cuisine

American Chinese cuisine
Cajun cuisine
Italian-American cuisine
Louisiana Creole cuisine
Midwestern cuisine
Native American cuisine
Southern cuisine
Southwestern cuisine
Tex-Mex cuisine

Cuisine of the regions

Cuisine of the Southwestern United States
Cuisine of the Mid-Atlantic United States
Cuisine of the Midwestern United States
Cuisine of the Northeastern United States
Cuisine of the Southern United States
Cuisine of the Western United States

Art in the United States

American Literature
American novelists
Great American Novel
Dance in the United States
Museums in the United States
Music of the United States
Theater of the United States
American playwrights
Television in the United States
Visual arts of the United States

Film

Cinema of the United States
Academy Award
Golden Globe Award
Highest-grossing films
Film production companies

Music in the United States

Best-selling Music Artists
Rock and Roll Hall of Fame

Genres

Alternative rock
Americana
Bluegrass music
Blues
Contemporary Christian music
Country music
Folk music
Gospel music
Hardcore punk
Heavy metal
Hip hop
Jazz
Punk rock
R&B music
Rock music
Soul music

Music in the states and territories

AK – AL – AR – AZ – CA – CO – CT – DC – DE – FL – GA – HI – IA – ID – IL – IN – KS – KY – LA – MA – MD – ME – MI – MN – MO – MS  MT – NC – ND – NE – NH – NM – NV – NJ – NY – OH – OK – OR – PA – RI – SC – SD – TN – TX – UT – VA – VT – WA – WI – WV – WY

AS – GU – MP – PR – VI

Radio

National Association of Broadcasters
NAB Broadcasting Hall of Fame

Sports in the United States

Football in the United States
Baseball in the United States
Little League Baseball
Motorsport in the United States
Soccer in the United States
Women's soccer in the United States
Stadiums in the United States

List of Major Sports Leagues in the United States

 Major League Baseball (MLB)
 National Basketball Association (NBA)
 National Football League (NFL)
 National Hockey League (NHL)
 Major League Soccer (MLS)

Other top-level leagues and series 

 IndyCar Series
 Legends Tour – for women's golfers age 45 and over
 LPGA Tour (Ladies' Professional Golf Association)
 Major League Lacrosse (MLL)
 Major League Rugby (MLR) – rugby union
 NASCAR (National Association for Stock Car Auto Racing)
 NASCAR Cup Series
 National Lacrosse League (NLL)
 National Women's Soccer League (NWSL)
 PGA Tour
 PGA Tour Champions – for men's golfers age 50 and over
 Professional Bull Riders (PBR)
 Professional Rodeo Cowboys Association (PRCA)
 Sports Car Club of America (SCCA)
 Women's National Basketball Association (WNBA)

Minor and developmental professional leagues and series 

 American Hockey League (AHL)
 American Indoor Football Association (AIFA)
 American National Rugby League (AMNRL)
 Continental Indoor Football League (CIFL)
 ECHL (formerly East Coast Hockey League)
 Korn Ferry Tour – men's golf
 Minor League Baseball
 National Arena League
 NBA G League
 Professional Inline Hockey Association (PIHA)
 Rugby Super League (RSL)
 Symetra Tour – women's golf
 United Indoor Football (UIF)
 United States Australian Football League (USAFL)
 Xfinity Series – NASCAR

College sports 

 College baseball
 College football
 College ice hockey
 College lacrosse
 College soccer
 College softball
 Collegiate wrestling
 Athletic scholarship
 College recruiting
 National Collegiate Athletic Association (NCAA)
 List of NCAA conferences
 NCAA Division I
 NCAA Division I Football Bowl Subdivision
 NCAA Division II
 NCAA Division III

Sports governing bodies 

 Professional Golfers' Association of America (PGA of America)
 United States of America Cricket Association (USACA)
 United States Golf Association (USGA)
 United States Olympic & Paralympic Committee (USOPC)
 United States Soccer Federation (U.S. Soccer)
 United States Tennis Association (USTA)
 USA Basketball
 USA Rugby – governs rugby union
 USA Track and Field

Sports by state and territory

AK – AL – AR – AZ – CA – CO – CT – DC – DE – FL – GA – HI – IA – ID – IL – IN – KS – KY – LA – MA – MD – ME – MI – MN – MO – MS  MT – NC – ND – NE – NH – NM – NV – NJ – NY – OH – OK – OR – PA – RI – SC – SD – TN – TX – UT – VA – VT – WA – WI – WV – WY

AS – GU – MP – PR – VI

Sports Museums in the United States

National Baseball Hall of Fame and Museum
Pro Football Hall of Fame
Hockey Hall of Fame
International Boxing Hall of Fame
International Tennis Hall of Fame
NASCAR Hall of Fame
Naismith Memorial Basketball Hall of Fame
World Golf Hall of Fame

Education in the United States

Early childhood education in the United States
K-12 education in the United States
High school in the United States
Homeschooling in the United States
Higher education in the United States
Community colleges in the United States
Vocational education in the United States
For-profit higher education in the United States
Liberal arts colleges in the United States
Language education in the United States

Education in the states and territories

AK – AL – AR – AZ – CA – CO – CT – DC – DE – FL – GA – HI – IA – ID – IL – IN – KS – KY – LA – MA – MD – ME – MI – MN – MO – MS  MT – NC – ND – NE – NH – NM – NV – NJ – NY – OH – OK – OR – PA – RI – SC – SD – TN – TX – UT – VA – VT – WA – WI – WV – WY

AS – GU – MP – PR – VI

Economy and infrastructure of the United States

Economic rank, by nominal GDP (2010): 1st
Economic rank, by GDP (PPP) (2010): 1st
Currency of the United States: US$
ISO 4217: USD
Banking in the United States
Federal Reserve System
Communications in the United States
Internet in the United States
American Registry for Internet Numbers (ARIN)
EDGAR
Form 10-K
Economic history of the United States
National debt by U.S. presidential terms
United States public debt
Energy in the United States
Electricity sector of the United States
Coal power in the United States
Coal mining in the United States
Nuclear power in the United States
Nuclear energy policy of the United States
Renewable energy in the United States
Geothermal energy in the United States
Solar power in the United States
Wind power in the United States
United States Wind Energy Policy
Energy conservation in the United States
Energy policy of the United States
U.S. Lighting Energy Policy
United States energy independence
Nuclear energy policy of the United States
United States Department of Energy
United States energy law
United States Senate Committee on Energy and Natural Resources
United States House Committee on Energy and Commerce
United States Wind Energy Policy
Petroleum in the United States
Offshore oil and gas in the United States
Oil reserves in the United States
Health care in the United States
Industry trade groups in the United States
Tourism in the United States
Shopping malls in the United States
Transportation in the United States
Air transportation in the United States
Airports in the United States
Highway system in the United States
Rail transport in the United States
Trade policy of the United States
North American Free Trade Agreement
Organisation for Economic Co-operation and Development
World Trade Organization
Wealth in the United States
American decline
American Dream
Household income in the United States
Income inequality in the United States
Personal income in the United States
Poverty in the United States
Water supply and sanitation in the United States

Economy by state and territory

AK – AL – AR – AZ – CA – CO – CT – DC – DE – FL – GA – HI – IA – ID – IL – IN – KS – KY – LA – MA – MD – ME – MI – MN – MO - MS  MT – NC – ND – NE – NH – NM – NV – NJ – NY – OH – OK – OR – PA – RI – SC – SD – TN – TX – UT – VA – VT – WA – WI – WV – WY

AS – GU – MP – PR – VI

Tourism in the United States

Walt Disney World
Hollywood
Ski Resorts

See also 

Topic overview:
United States
Index of United States-related articles

Notes

References

External links

 Government
Official U.S. Government Web Portal Gateway to governmental sites
White House Official site of the President of the United States
Senate Official site of the United States Senate
House Official site of the United States House of Representatives
[ Supreme Court] Official site of the Supreme Court of the United States
Library of Congress Official site of the Library of Congress

 Overviews and Data
Portrait of the United States Overview from the U.S. Information Agency
United States CIA World Factbook entry
United States Encyclopædia Britannica entry
U.S. Census Housing and Economic Statistics Wide-ranging data from the U.S. Census Bureau
State Fact Sheets Population, employment, income, and farm data from the U.S. Economic Research Service
The 50 States of the U.S.A. Collected informational links for each state

 History
Historical Documents Collected by the National Center for Public Policy Research
U.S. National Mottos: History and Constitutionality Analysis by the Ontario Consultants on Religious Tolerance
USA Collected links to historical data

 Maps

National Atlas of the United States Official maps from the U.S. Department of the Interior

 Other
U.S. Citizenship and Immigration Services Official government site

United States